Selayar or Saleyer (Indonesian: Kabupaten Selayar, Dutch: Saleijer), is an archipelago of South Sulawesi province, Indonesia. It lies in the Flores Sea, between Sulawesi and Flores, around 150 km southeast of the major city of Makassar. Kabupaten Selayar is the Regency, covering 1,357 km² with a population of about 138,000 (2021). There are 73 islands, the main one being Selayar Island. To the east lies Pulau (Island) Kalaotoa and Pulau Karompa Lompo (in Sulawesi Tenggara province), and to the west lies Kepulauan Sabalana (the Sabalana Islands). It is a biodiverse diving site.

Islands

 Selayar Island
 Pulau Pulasi
 Pulau Tambalongang
 Pulau Tanahjampea
 Pulau Batu
 Pulau Kayuadi
 Pulau Panjang
 Macan Islands  Islands include Latondu, Rajuni, Timabo, Pasi Tallu, and Taka Lamungan.
 Pulau Kalao
 Pulau Bonerate
 Bahuluang

The Selayar Strait (Selat Selayar) is more than 100 fathoms deep and, with a strong current, is dangerous for native ships to navigate. The strata of Selayar Island are all sedimentary rocks: coraline limestone, occasionally sandstone; everywhere, except in the north and north-west, covered by a fertile soil. The watershed is a chain running throughout the island from N. to S., reaching in Bontona Haru 5840 ft.,\ and sloping steeply to the east coast.

People
The population, mainly a mixture of Makasars, Bugis and the natives of Luvu and Buton, is estimated in mid 2021 at 89,147 on the main island and 48,827 on the islands to the southeast of it. They speak the Makassar language and are for the most part nominally Muslims (though many non-Muslim customs survive) and support themselves by agriculture, fishing, seafaring, trade, the preparation of salt (on the south coast) and weaving. Raw and prepared cotton, tobacco, trepang, tortoise-shell, coconuts and coconut oil, and salt are exported. There is frequent movement between the area and other parts of Sulawesi as well as to other parts Indonesia. For that reason, and also because of its excellent horses and numerous water buffaloes, the Saleyar Islands are often compared with Madura, being of the same importance to Sulawesi as is Madura to Java.

References

See also
Wonderful Selayar - Tourism  '

 
Archipelagoes of Indonesia
Landforms of South Sulawesi
Islands of Sulawesi
Populated places in Indonesia